R500 may refer to:

 R500 Series. Radeon X1000 Series video cards
 Superlight R500, a vehicle produced by Caterham Racing
 R500 road (South Africa)
 R500 road (Ireland)
 Mercedes-Benz R-Class R500, a car